The Governor of Rivne Oblast is the head of executive branch for the Rivne Oblast.

The office of Governor is an appointed position, with officeholders being appointed by the President of Ukraine, on recommendation from the Prime Minister of Ukraine, to serve four-year term.

The official residence for the Governor is located in Rivne. Since 9 September 2019 the Governor is Vitaliy Koval.

Governors
 Roman Vasylyshyn (1992–1994, as the Presidential representative)
 Roman Vasylyshyn (1995–1997, as the Governor)
 Mykola Soroka (1997–2005)
 Vasyl Chervoniy (2005–2006)
 Viktor Matchuk (2006–2010)
 Yuriy Blahodyr (2010, acting)
 Vasyl Bertash (2010–2014)
 Serhiy Rybachok (2014) 
 Yuriy Pryvarskyi (2014, acting)
 Vitaliy Chuhunnikov (2014–2016)
 Oleksiy Mulyarenko (2016–2019)
 Ihor Tymoshenko (2019, acting)
 Vitaliy Koval (2019–)

Notes

References

Sources
 World Statesmen.org

External links
Government of Rivne Oblast in Ukrainian

 
Rivne Oblast